is an interchange passenger railway station in the Yūkarigaoka neighborhood of the city of Sakura, Chiba Prefecture, Japan, operated by Keisei Electric Railway.

Lines
The station is also served by the Yamaman Yukarigaoka Line.

Station layout
The Keisei portion of the station has a single side platform and an island platform serving three tracks, connected to an elevated station building. The Yamaman portion of the station has a single side platform.

Platforms

Keisei Line

Yamaman Yukarigaoka Line

History
Yūkarigaoka Station opened on 1 November 1982.

Station numbering was introduced to all Keisei Line stations on 17 July 2010. Yūkarigaoka Station was assigned station number KS32.

Passenger statistics
In fiscal 2019, the station was used by an average of 21,456 passengers daily.

Surrounding area
 Chiba Prefectural Sakura Nishi High School
 Sakura City Kamishizu Elementary School

See also
 List of railway stations in Japan

References

External links

 Keisei Station layout 

Railway stations in Japan opened in 1982
Railway stations in Chiba Prefecture
Keisei Main Line
Sakura, Chiba